Larang Sai (20 October 1935 – 7 January 2004) was a leader of Bharatiya Janata Party. He was a member of Lok Sabha and served as union minister of state in Labour ministry from 1977 to 1979. He was Member of Parliament from Surguja Lok Sabha constituency in 1977 as Bharatiya Lok Dal, in 1989 and 1998 as Bharatiya Janata Party.

References

1935 births
2004 deaths
Union ministers of state of India
Lok Sabha members from Chhattisgarh
Bharatiya Janata Party politicians from Madhya Pradesh
People from Ambikapur, India
Labour ministers of India
Madhya Pradesh MLAs 1967–1972
Madhya Pradesh MLAs 1972–1977
Madhya Pradesh MLAs 1980–1985
India MPs 1977–1979
India MPs 1989–1991
India MPs 1998–1999
Bharatiya Lok Dal politicians
Bharatiya Jana Sangh politicians